Mofiz Uddin Talukder is a Jatiya Party (Ershad) politician and the former Member of Parliament of Sirajganj-5.

Career
Talukder was elected to parliament from Sirajganj-5 as a Jatiya Party candidate in 1986.

References

Jatiya Party politicians
Living people
4th Jatiya Sangsad members
Year of birth missing (living people)
People from Sirajganj District